Ahmad Zayni Dahlan (1816–1886) was the Grand Mufti of the Shafi'i madhab in Mecca, and Shaykh al-Islam (highest religious authority in the Ottoman jurisdiction) in the Hijaz region of the Ottoman state, and Imam al-Haramayn (Imam of the two holy cities, Mecca and Medina), as well as being a historian and an Ash'ari theologian. He was known for his extreme criticisms of Wahhabism and his tendency toward Sufism (Mysticism). In his treatise against Wahhabi influence, Dahlan clearly views Sufism as a legal and integral part of Islamic practice – including such aspects as Tawassul (intercession, or addressing God through an intermediary), Tabarruk (seeking blessings through persons or things), and Ziyarat al-Qubur (the visitation of tombs and graves).

He was the descendant of 'Abd al-Qadir al-Jilani. He authored, and personally published numerous works on history, fiqh, and the Islamic sciences in general.

Birth 
He was born in Mecca in 1816 or 1817.

Teachers 
He studied under Ahmad al-Marzuqi al-Maliki al-Makki.

Students 
His students were so many, to the extent that it is rare to find a scholar who came after him whose chains of narrations do not include him. Among his students were Hussein bin Ali, Sharif of Mecca who studied the Qur'an with him and completed its memorization, Imam Ahmed Raza Khan Qadri Barelvi, Khalil Ahmad Saharanpuri, Sheikh Mustafa, Usman bin Yahya, Arsyad Thawil al-Bantani, Muhammad Amrullah, and Ahmad b. Hasan al-'Attas.

Works 
He wrote and taught in an era when the first printing press came to Mecca, Dahlan was able to disseminate his challenges to Salafism through his devoted students. He wrote, for instance, a booklet outlining the suffering Wahhabis brought to Mecca during their rule in the first quarter of the nineteenth century, Fitnat al-Wahhabiyyah, and also a study refuting the entire Wahhabi doctrine and practices, Al-Durar al-Saniyyah fi al-Radd 'ala al-Wahhabiyyah.

Following is a list of some of his published works:
 Fitnat al-Wahhabiyyah.
 Al-Durar al-Saniyyah fi al-Radd 'ala al-Wahhabiyyah.
 Khulasat al-Kalam fi Bayan Umara' al-Balad al-Haram.
 Al-Futuhat al-Islamiyyah ba'da Mudhiy al-Futuhat al-Nabawiyyah.
 Sharh al-Ajurrumiyyah, by Ibn Ajurrum.
 Sharh al-Alfiyyah, by Ibn Malik.
 Tanbih al-Ghafilin, Mukhtasar Minhaj al-'Abidin, by al-Ghazali.

Death 
He died in Medina in 1886.

See also 
 Sulayman ibn 'Abd al-Wahhab
 Jamal ibn Abd Allah Shaykh Umar
 Malik R. Dahlan
 List of Muslim historians
 List of Muslim theologians
 List of Ash'aris and Maturidis
 List of Sufis

Notes

References

External links
 A Brief Biography of Ahmad Zayni Dahlan 

Asharis
Shafi'is
Shaykh al-Islāms
Sunni Sufis
Sunni imams
Sunni Muslim scholars of Islam
19th-century Muslim theologians
Arab historians
Historians of Islam
Arab grammarians
Arab linguists
Hadith scholars
Hashemite people
Muftis of Mecca
Critics of Wahhabism
1810s births
1886 deaths
19th-century Arabic writers